Forschungsjournal Soziale Bewegungen is a German quarterly academic journal devoted to issues of democratization, social movements and political sociology. The current editors are Ansgar Klein, Hans-Josef Legrand, Jan Rohwerder and Jochen Roose. Published by Walter de Gruyter since 2016, the journal was founded in 1988 under the title Forschungsjournal Neue Soziale Bewegungen and renamed in 2011.

References

External links 

 

German-language journals
Publications established in 1988
Academic journals published in Germany
Political science journals
Quarterly journals